This is a list of metropolitan areas by population in India. The 74th Amendment to the Indian Constitution defines a metropolitan area as: An area having a population of 10 Lakh or 1 Million or more, comprised in one or more districts and consisting of two or more Municipalities or Panchayats or other contiguous areas, specified by the Governor by public notification to be a Metropolitan area.

List

See also
 List of cities in India by population
 List of million-plus urban agglomerations in India
 List of states and union territories of India by population
 Demographics of India

References 

Metropolitan areas of India